Sindukht (meaning "the daughter of Simorgh) is the wife of Mehrab Kaboli and the mother of Roodabeh, in the Persian epic poem Shahnameh by Ferdowsi. She is described as "a beautiful and intelligent woman". When she learned about the love between Roodabeh and Zāl, she first became angry, arguing that Sām (father of Zāl) and Manuchehr (then king of Iran) would disapprove of their marriage and so they would destroy Kabul (because they worshiped different religions and Mehrab was of Zahhak's descendants), but when Zāl managed to convince Sām and Manuchehr, Sindukht and Mehrab also supported their marriage. She is the grandmother of Rostam.

Family tree

References

Further reading 
 

Women in Shahnameh
Persian mythology
Persian feminine given names